The Indochinese flying squirrel (Hylopetes phayrei), also known as Phayre's flying squirrel, is a species of rodent in the family Sciuridae. It is found in China, Laos, Myanmar, Thailand, and Vietnam.

References

Hylopetes
Mammals described in 1859
Taxa named by Edward Blyth
Taxonomy articles created by Polbot